Lewis Philip Ohliger (January 3, 1843 – January 9, 1923) was an American politician who briefly served as a U.S. Representative from Ohio from 1892 to 1893.

Biography 
Born in Rheinpfalz, Bavaria, Germany, Ohliger Immigrated to the United States in October 1854 with his parents.
He settled in Canton, Ohio, in 1857.
He attended the public schools.
He moved to Wooster, Ohio, and engaged in the wholesale drug and grocery business.
County treasurer 1875-1879.
Postmaster of Wooster from February 1885 until February 1890.
Trustee of the Wooster & Lodi Railway.
He served as delegate to the Democratic National Convention in 1892.

Congress 
Ohliger was elected as a Democrat to the Fifty-second Congress to fill the vacancy caused by the death of John G. Warwick and served from December 5, 1892, to March 3, 1893.
He was an unsuccessful for renomination in 1892.
Internal-revenue collector of the Cleveland district by appointment of President Grover Cleveland 1893-1898.
He resumed his former business pursuits.

Death
He died in San Diego, California, January 9, 1923, and was interred in Wooster Cemetery, Wooster, Ohio.

Sources

1843 births
1923 deaths
Bavarian emigrants to the United States
People from Canton, Ohio
19th-century American railroad executives
American pharmacists
People from Wooster, Ohio
Democratic Party members of the United States House of Representatives from Ohio